Douglas James Kern (born July 10, 1963 in Fort Riley, Kansas) is an American former competitive sailor who won a silver medal at the 1992 Olympic Games in Barcelona.

Career
At the 1992 Summer Olympics, Kern finished in 2nd place in the soling class along with his partners Jim Brady and Kevin Mahaney.

References

 

1963 births
Living people
American male sailors (sport)
Medalists at the 1992 Summer Olympics
North American Champions Soling
Olympic silver medalists for the United States in sailing
People from Fort Riley, Kansas
Sailors at the 1992 Summer Olympics – Soling